The mixed team competition at the 2018 Asian Games in Jakarta was held on 1 September at the Jakarta Convention Center Assembly Hall.

Schedule
All times are Western Indonesia Time (UTC+07:00)

Results

Bracket

Main

Repechage

Elimination round of 16

Quarterfinals

Repechage

Semifinals

Bronze medal contests

Gold medal contest

Non-participating athletes

References

External links

Official website

Team
Asian Games 2018